Monadeniinae is a taxonomic subfamily of small to medium-sized air-breathing land snails, terrestrial pulmonate gastropod mollusks in the family Xanthonychidae

Anatomy
This subfamily is defined by an absent diverticulum. The species have one dart apparatus, a stylophore (dart sac), one mucous gland, with a muscular duct that is inserted at base of the dart sac.

Genera 
Genera within the subfamily Modaneiinae include:
 Monadenia Pilsbry, 1895 - type genus

References

Xanthonychidae